Area 23 can refer to:

 Area 23 (Nevada National Security Site)
 Brodmann area 23